An election to Hampshire County Council took place on 4 June 2009 as part of the 2009 United Kingdom local elections, having been delayed from 7 May, to coincide with elections to the European Parliament. 78 councillors were elected from 75 electoral divisions, which returned either one or two county councillors each by first-past-the-post voting for a four-year term of office. The electoral divisions were the same as those used at the previous election in 2005. Elections in Portsmouth and Southampton do not coincide with this set, being unitary authorities outside the area covered by the County Council.

All locally registered electors (British, Irish, Commonwealth and European Union citizens) who were aged 18 or over on Thursday 2 May 2009 were entitled to vote in the local elections. Those who were temporarily away from their ordinary address (for example, away working, on holiday, in student accommodation or in hospital) were also entitled to vote in the local elections, although those who had moved abroad and registered as overseas electors cannot vote in the local elections. It is possible to register to vote at more than one address (such as a university student who had a term-time address and lives at home during holidays) at the discretion of the local Electoral Register Office, but it remains an offence to vote more than once in the same local government election.

Summary
The election saw the Conservatives retain control of the council and increase their majority from 14 seats to 24 seats. As the largest opposition party, the Liberal Democrats lost seats overall, while Labour were reduced to holding just one seat (Basingstoke North). The Community Campaign in Hart also won a seat in Church Crookham and Ewshot.

Results

|}

Results by district 
Hampshire County Council is split into 11 Districts, each district is further split into wards, the following are the results for these wards.

Basingstoke and Deane

Eastleigh

East Hampshire

Fareham

Gosport

Hart

Havant

New Forest

Rushmoor

Test Valley

Winchester

References

2009 English local elections
2009
2000s in Hampshire